Amasa Sprague (April 10, 1798 – December 31, 1843) was an American businessman and politician from Rhode Island. He co-founded the A & W Sprague textile firm with his brother William Sprague III. He was murdered on New Year's Eve, 1843.

Business career
Sprague was born on April 10, 1798 in Cranston, Rhode Island. He began his career working father William Sprague II’s cotton mill. As the elder Sprague's business expanded, Amasa assisted his father in purchasing raw materials and selling the finished product. William Sprague II died on March 28, 1836 and after their father's will was settled, Sprague and his brother William Sprague III founded A & W Sprague to continue the cotton and calico business. Amasa Sprague was the senior partner and superintendent of the print works.

Sprague represented Cranston in the Rhode Island House of Representatives in 1832, 1840, and 1841.

Personal life
Sprague and his wife, Fanny Morgan had four children
Mary Anna Sprague, wife of John E. Nichols (first) and Frank W. Latham (second)
Almyra Sprague, wife of Providence, Rhode Island mayor Thomas A. Doyle
Amasa Sprague Jr., founder of Narragansett Park
William Sprague IV, Governor of Rhode Island and United States Senator

Murder
On December 31, 1843, Sprague was shot in the arm and beaten to death by at least two men. The motive was not robbery, as $60 and a gold watch was found on Sprague's body. Nicholas Gordon, a tavern owner whose liquor license had been revoked by the Cranston city council at Sprague's insistence, and his brothers William and John Gordon were tried for the murder. William was found not guilty and Nicholas' two trials ended in a hung jury, but John Gordon was found guilty and executed on February 14, 1845. Gordon’s conviction has been ascribed by researchers to anti-Roman Catholic and anti-Irish immigrant bias, and in 2011 he was granted a posthumous pardon.

References

1798 births
1843 deaths
American murder victims
American textile industry businesspeople
Members of the Rhode Island House of Representatives
People from Cranston, Rhode Island